J. Raymond McGovern (December 22, 1898 – March 14, 1974) was an American lawyer and politician.

Early life and education
He was born on December 22, 1898, in New Rochelle, New York. McGovern graduated from Fordham University and the Fordham University School of Law.

Career 
He was a partner in the law firm of McGovern, Connelly & Davidson in New Rochelle.

He was a member of the New York State Senate from 1945 to 1950. He served as New York State Comptroller from 1951 to 1954, elected on the Republican ticket at the New York state election, 1950. In 1954, he ran for Lieutenant Governor of New York as the running mate of Irving Ives, but they were narrowly defeated by the Democratic–Liberal Party nominees.

Death 
He died on March 14, 1974, in New Rochelle, New York.

References

Sources
Political Graveyard

New York State Comptrollers
1898 births
1974 deaths
Politicians from New Rochelle, New York
Republican Party New York (state) state senators
20th-century American politicians
Lawyers from New Rochelle, New York
20th-century American lawyers